is a metro station on the  Osaka Metro Chūō Line and Imazatosuji Line in Higashinari-ku, Osaka, Japan.

Lines

 (Station Number: C20)
 (Station Number: I20)

Layout
There is an island platform with 2 tracks underground for each line.  The platform for the Imazatosuji Line is fenced with platform gates.

Chūō Line

Imazatosuji Line

Higashinari-ku, Osaka
Jōtō-ku, Osaka
Osaka Metro stations
Railway stations in Osaka
Railway stations in Japan opened in 1968